Rocky Point is an unincorporated community in Botetourt County, Virginia, United States.

History
Rocky Point's population was 15 in 1900,  and 14 in 1925.

References

Unincorporated communities in Botetourt County, Virginia
Unincorporated communities in Virginia